The 1965 Iowa Hawkeyes football team represented the University of Iowa in the 1965 Big Ten Conference football season. Led by Jerry Burns in his fifth and final season as head coach, the Hawkeyes compiled an overall record of 1–9 with a mark of 0–7 in conference play, placing last in the Big Ten. The team played home games at Iowa Stadium in Iowa City, Iowa.

Schedule

References

Iowa
Iowa Hawkeyes football seasons
Hawkeyes